The Rich-Tone Chorus is an all-female, barbershop chorus, located in northern Texas in the United States. The group was founded in 1968 in the city of Richardson. The musical director (since 1976) is Dale Syverson.

The Rich-Tone Chorus is a chapter, located in Northern Texas, of a worldwide non-profit organization known as Sweet Adelines International. This is a group of over 30,000 women committed to advancing the musical art form of barbershop harmony through education and performance.

The members of the Rich-Tone Chorus range in age from 17 to 75 and are from all over the North Texas area.
The membership is drawn from a cross-section of society; including accountants, doctors, engineers, homemakers, nurses, and teachers.

The Rich-Tones' musical repertoire includes contemporary hits, big band, Broadway and American classics.

International recognition
Internationally, the Rich-Tone Chorus aim to compete by displaying an innovative entertainment style that pushes the limits of barbershop music. Each year, Sweet Adelines choruses throughout the world compete at an annual competition – the Olympics of Barbershop. Twenty-six regional championship choruses compete for the gold medal title of International Chorus Champions. The Rich-Tone Chorus is the first in its five-state region to earn the world's championship titles and will return to International Competition again.

The Rich-Tone Chorus have developed a progressive entertainment style as well as a strong barbershop sound, and have been judged the "best in the world" five times: in 1992, 1995, 1998, 2006, and 2009. They are the first chorus in the history of the Sweet Adelines International to win three consecutive first place medals.  The Rich-Tone Chorus was also the first chorus in the organization to achieve a score of 700 for a single performance in 1992, giving their director the first 'Master Director 700' title.

In 2012 Rich-Tones were honored to win 2nd place and the first ever Celebrity Award, presented by celebrity judge Cynthia Hessin, executive producer Rocky Mountain PBS and given to the chorus most likely to appeal to a non-barbershop audience.

History

Musical direction
Dale Syverson has been the musical director of the Rich-Tone Chorus since 1976, during which time the chorus has grown from 18 members to over 150. She is the daughter of a barbershopper, and has been a part of the Sweet Adelines organization since she was a child, and is qualified as a Certified Expression Judge. She is the recipient of the 2004 SAI "President's Lifetime Achievement Award", an honor which has been awarded annually by the President of Sweet Adelines International since 1998 to a member whose contributions to and achievements within the organization are truly exceptional.  Dale is a certified judge in both Expression and Sound Categories. She is a two-time "Queen of Harmony," winning an international quartet gold medal singing with the Tiffanys in 1973 and Rumors in 1998.

External links
 Rich-Tone Chorus website
 Sweet Adelines International

Discography
The Rich-Tone Chorus has produced 10 albums (CDs) for sale on their website and through popular online music sites, such as iTunes, Rhapsody, Spotify and Amazon MP3.

One of a Kind (1990)
Turnin' Up the Heat (1993)
Rich-Tones – Unwrapped! (1994)
50TH Anniversary (1995)
Footloose (1996)
Take 3 (1999)
A "Live" and Swingin' (2000)
Wrapped Up in the Holidays (2002)
What Happens in Vegas (2007)
Born This Way (2013)

References

A cappella musical groups
American vocal groups
Choirs in Texas
Sweet Adelines International
Musical groups established in 1968